Nagendra Jamatia (  – 21 January 2019) was an Indian politician from Tripura belonging to  Indigenous Nationalist Party of Twipra. He was a legislator of the Tripura Legislative Assembly. He was a minister of the Tripura Government too.

Biography
Jamatia was elected as a member of the Tripura Legislative Assembly from Ampinagar as a Tripura Upajati Juba Samiti candidate in 1977, 1983 and 1988. Jamatia brokered peace with the insurgent Tripura National Volunteers in 1988. He served as Agriculture and Horticulture minister of Tripura Government from 1988 to 1993.

Jamatia was also elected as a member of the Tripura Legislative Assembly from Ampinagar as a Tripura Upajati Juba Samiti candidate  in 1998. Later, the TUJS, The IPFT and TNV merged to form the INPT Indigenous Nationalist Party of Twipra. He served as the vice president of the party too. He was elected as a member of the Tripura Legislative Assembly from Ampinagar as an Indigenous Nationalist Party of Twipra candidate in 2003.

Jamatia was married to Pabitra Rani Jamatia. They had two children.

Jamatia died on 21 January 2019 at the age of 71.

Student Life and Entry into Politics:

He was a brilliant student academically and did his schooling from Ramesh School at Udaipur. He was the first student from Kakaraban area in general and Tuta kami in specific to pass class 10 matric exam with 2nd division. He did his graduation from Maharaja Bir Bikram college  (MBB College) at Agartala. He was always good in mathematics at school and so got admitted in science stream initially but later on changed his subject to Arts as he was passionate about literature and economics.

He was classmate of shri Manik Sarkar ex CM of Tripura at Ramesh school Udaipur and shri Badal Choudhury ex Minister at MBB College, Agartala. Shri Pijush Kanti Biswas, the present Congress President of Tripura was also a batchmate at Agartala in college.

In spite of his academic brilliance he never registered himself in the employment exchange register of the state and began his political career from his student days. He was deeply saddened by the discrimination of the indigenous population of the state which was reduced to a minority within a short period of time due to the rapid and sudden influx of refugees from East Pakistan which later on became Bangladesh.

Later he joined TUJS and became an MLA of the state and subsequently a Minister from the same party.

Personal life

He was born the third child of Smt Gandhi Kanya Jamatia and Shri Mohan Chandra Jamatia who were farmers in the small village of Tota Kami under the present Gomati District of the state. They were three sisters and two brothers.

More than his father it was his mother who inspired him since childhood with her wisdom and intelligence. She was a master in story telling and  had the verbal knowledge of Mahabharat, Ramayan and all the folk tales of the state. She was also a great diplomat in solving the various domestic problems arising within the families of relatives and the villages and late shri Nagendra Jamatia probably inherited some of those qualities from his mother.

During his school days also whenever he came home during holidays, he would collect other children from his village and teach them. He would even teach his elder sisters who dropped out of school and would be very strict with them. He once beat them with a stick for not being able to memorise their homework and was chased by his father for his over enthusiastic role as a teacher to his sisters!

Nagendra Jamatia married Smt Pabitra Rani Jamatia, who was the eldest daughter of late shri Beni Chandra Jamatia (he won the prestigious Padmashri Award in 2019) from Mayungtwisa Kaami in 1972. Smt Pabitra Rani Jamatia was also actively involved in politics and was a supporter of TUJS from before marriage. They had two children, one boy and one girl.

Major political achievements through TUJS:-

1. Formation of TTAADC under the 6th schedule of the Indian Constitution.

2. The TNV Peace Accord between the Tribal National Volunteers and the Indian Government which increased the number of Assembly Seats of the Indigenous People (ST) to 1/3rd of the Total Seats of 60.

Major Achievement as a Minister:-

Was able to start water irrigation facilities in the majority of the villages of the Indigenous People of the state, thereby promoting Agriculture and also Fishery among them. There was a paradigm shift from the traditional Jhum Cultivation to Agricultural Farming.

Contributions in Literature
Right from his student days, the nationalistic ideology in his heart, inspired him to publish many monthly magazines in Kok Borok.
Choba and  Dongor were some of the popular ones.
He went on to write many short stories and novels and drama.
His books Hathai, Bichitra Andaman, Bolong, Hakor Bisingni Onkharbaisidi have made a mark in the Kok Borok literature of the state.
He was equally active in writing articles in the mainstream newspapers of the state on current political or social issues.
He had also written a weekly column "Haathai Burasa" for the Dainik Sambad, for about 1 to 2 years in 1994-95 which was very popular among readers at that point of time.
In his later years he wanted to write more for the children, so he published a book for children named Yakaam.

He has received many awards for his contribution to Kok Borok literature.
In one of his speeches he rightly said that he was more of a writer than a politician.

References

1940s births
2019 deaths
Indigenous Nationalist Party of Twipra politicians
People from Gomati district
State cabinet ministers of Tripura
Tripura MLAs 1977–1983
Tripura MLAs 1983–1988
Tripura MLAs 1988–1993